John Henry Arnott (6 September 1932 − 31 March 2017) was an English professional footballer. His clubs included West Ham United, Shrewsbury Town, Bournemouth & Boscombe Athletic and Gillingham, where he made 186 Football League appearances.

Career
Born in Sydenham, Arnott began his career as an amateur for West Ham United and played for them from 1954 to 1955. He had one season with Shrewsbury Town before joining Bournemouth & Boscombe Athletic in 1956, where he spent six seasons and made 176 League appearances before being transferred to Gillingham in August 1962.  Arnott's last club was Dover from 1969 to 1976.

Personal life
Arnott was a teacher who spent 23 years teaching physical education at Kingsdale Secondary School, Dulwich, south London.

References

1932 births
2017 deaths
English footballers
People from Sydenham, London
Gillingham F.C. players
West Ham United F.C. players
AFC Bournemouth players
Shrewsbury Town F.C. players
Dover F.C. players
English Football League players
Association football midfielders